The Liberal Democratic Party, shortened as LDP, Liberal Democrats, or Lib Dems, is an Australian political party founded in Canberra in 2001. The party espouses smaller government and supports policies that are based on classical liberal, libertarian principles, such as lower taxes, opposing restrictions on civil liberties, decentralisation, utilising nuclear energy, and the relaxation of smoking laws.

The LDP is a registered party in the Australian Capital Territory, New South Wales, South Australia, Victoria and Western Australia and was formerly registered for federal elections with the Australian Electoral Commission. As of March 2023, it only has one representative in the Victorian Legislative Council, David Limbrick, and elected representatives in some local governments. The most recent federal representation of the party was in April 2022, when independent senator Sam McMahon joined the Liberal Democrats, giving the party representation in the Australian Senate. However, she lost her seat in the May 2022 federal election and the party was deregistered at the federal level on 19 July 2022.

History

Formation 
The Liberal Democratic Party was founded in 2001 as a political party registered in the Australian Capital Territory. It first contested elections in the 2001 ACT election, receiving 1 percent of the vote. The party also contested the 2004 ACT election, receiving 1.3 percent of the vote.

In 2006, changes to the Electoral Act by the Howard government forced all parties without parliamentary representation to deregister and re-register under stricter naming rules. Advised by the Australian Electoral Commission that federal registration under the original name was uncertain given opposition by the Liberal Party of Australia, the party chose to register federally as the Liberty and Democracy Party in 2007. The Liberty and Democracy Party contested 2007 federal election, winning 17,048 votes (0.14 percent) in the lower house and 16,942 votes (0.13 percent) in the upper house.

In 2008, the party successfully applied to the Australian Electoral Commission to change its federally registered name to Liberal Democratic Party. During this period, the party remained registered under its original name in the Australian Capital Territory (ACT).

Initial electoral contests 
In 2010, the party contested the 2010 federal election, receiving 1.8 percent of the national senate vote and an average of 1.3 percent across the 21 lower house seats it contested, with a best of 5.52 percent in Gippsland.

In 2012, the Liberal Democratic Party had its first successful election win. Jeff Pettett was elected as a Councillor to the Ku-ring-gai Council in northern metropolitan Sydney at the New South Wales local government elections, gaining 24 per cent of vote in the absence of Liberal Party candidates. Clinton Mead was elected as a Councillor to the Campbelltown Council in southern metropolitan Sydney at the New South Wales local government elections

Prior to the 2012 Ramsay and Port Adelaide state by-elections in South Australia, the polls in The Advertiser newspaper gave the LDP 23 percent and 14 percent of the vote respectively in the absence of Liberal Party candidates. The LDP ended up with votes of 13.3 percent and 7.3 percent respectively. The paper described the LDP as "a hardline liberal party that demands abolition of government welfare as well as the minimum wage, seatbelts and bike helmets. It backs legalisation of marijuana and increased freedom to access pornography".

At the 2013 federal election, LDP candidate David Leyonhjelm was elected to the Senate after polling the third highest vote in the state of New South Wales after the Liberal Party of Australia and the Australian Labor Party. According to Leyonhjelm, a portion of their vote probably came from their 'first position' on the long senate ballot paper and voters potentially being confused with his party and other contesting parties such as the Liberals, the Australian Democrats and the Christian Democratic Party. However, Leyonhjelm points to the fact that the Liberal Democrats' vote in South Australia, where they were fifth on the ballot, rose 3 percentage points. He also points to the fact that the donkey vote generally only produces swings of +1 or 2 percentage points to the party listed first on the ballot. Leyonhjelm organised preferences for several different, but closely entwined, political parties seeking election to the Senate, including the Outdoor Recreation Party, Smokers' Rights Party and the Republican Party of Australia. Australian Sex Party candidate Fiona Patten alleged Leyonhjelm intentionally failed to lodge ticket voting preferences forms, reneging on a preference deal, but Leyonhjelm claimed that there was a mistake entering the AEC fax number. The Liberal Democrats were not involved in Glenn Druery's Minor Party Alliance during the election which assisted in negotiating preference flows between minor parties. On 1 July 2014, David Leyonhjelm became the Liberal Democratic Party's first senator.

Shortly after David Leyonhjelm's Senate victory, Liberal Democrats councillor Clinton Mead was elected Mayor of the City of Campbelltown in New South Wales.

In 2015, the Liberal Democrats registered with the Victorian Electoral Commission (VEC), and announced it would field upper-house candidates in the upcoming Victorian state election on 29 November 2014.
In 2016, the Liberal Party sought to challenge the name of the party with the electoral commission, but ultimately abandoned the action.

David Leyonhjelm was re-elected with a 3.1 percent (−6.4) primary vote, or 139,000 votes, at the 2016 double dissolution federal election. Gabriel Buckley, the LDP's lead candidate in Queensland, marginally misses out on a seat.

WA elections were held 11 March 2017 where the states first LDP member, Aaron Stonehouse was elected.

In May 2017, former Leader of the Opposition and political commentator Mark Latham left the Australian Labor Party and joined the LDP.

In 2018 candidates Tim Quilty and David Limbrick were elected to the Victorian Legislative Council (state upper house). In the same year, Mark Latham left the party to become the leader of One Nation NSW division.

In 2019, David Leyonhjelm announced that he will be quitting federal parliament in order to contest the New South Wales state election. This resulted in Duncan Spender being sworn in to fill Leyonhjelm's former seat until the next Federal election. David Leyonhjelm did not get elected in the 2019 New South Wales election securing only 0.46 of a seat quota. Duncan Spender also lost their Senate seat in the 2019 election.

In the Victorian Local Government election of 2020 the party fielded 11 candidates state-wide. Two endorsed candidates were elected, Olga Quilty in Wodonga with a 5.83% first preference vote against 18 other candidates and Paul Barker in Torquay with a 11.67% first preference vote against 9 other candidates.

Recent developments 
On 18 May 2017, the Liberal Democratic Party formed a  'conservative bloc' with One Nation and the Shooters, Fishers and Farmers Party in the Western Australia Legislative Council.

During the COVID-19 pandemic, Victorian MPs Quilty and Limbrick became outspoken critics of the Victorian Parliament, the Federal Parliament, and Australia's COVID response in whole. On August 17, 2021, while the Victorian Parliament was closed due to restrictions, the two protested park closures on the steps of Parliament in the presence of armed police. They refused to comply with a vaccine mandate for MP's, with Limbrick publicly destroying his vaccination status card.

In May 2021 the party founder Dr John Humphreys was re-elected to the position of National President.

In July 2021, Campbell Newman, the former Premier of Queensland and Leader of the Liberal National Party of Queensland, resigned from the LNP, stating the LNP candidate in the 2021 Stretton state by-election was "let down by a party and leadership that never stands up for anything". In August 2021, he announced he had joined the LDP to run as the party's lead Senate candidate in Queensland at the 2022 Australian federal election.

On 16 October 2021, Quilty, Limbrick, and other opposition MPs were ejected from Victorian Parliament for refusing to disclose their vaccination status. After two weeks of exclusion, the MP's submitted their vaccination status on October 28, 2021, in order to return to parliament to oppose the legislative agenda of the government.

On 23 November 2021, the LDP announced a preference deal with the United Australia Party in the upcoming Australian elections where each party would encourage its members to choose the other as their second preference.

On 24 November 2021 Krystle Mitchell, an acting Senior Sergeant of the Victorian Police who resigned after speaking publicly against enforcing health orders, announced she would be running for Federal Senate with the Liberal Democrats as their second in Victoria.

According to The Age, between November 2018 and November 2021, the Liberal Democratic Party's Legislative Council members voted with the Andrews Government's position 22.1% of the time, which was less than the opposition Coalition (28.9%).

Due to changes in the Commonwealth Electoral Act 1918 and a subsequent objection to the party's name by the Liberal Party, the Liberal Democratic Party applied to the Australian Electoral Commission (AEC) to change its name to the Liberty and Democracy Party in February 2022 in order to remain registered. The party then withdrew the name change application on 22 March 2022. On 1 April 2022, the AEC gave notice to the party that it would consider deregistering the latter, giving one month for the party to appeal the notice. However, as the writs for the May federal election were issued the following week on 11 April, the party register then would be "frozen" and this meant the party was allowed to contest the election with its current name.

On 8 April 2022, Senator Sam McMahon joined the party after defecting from the Country Liberal Party in January. This gave the federal parliamentary representation to the Liberal Democratic Party. McMahon would also be the lead Senate candidate for the party at the May federal election. She was unsuccessful in her election and the party lost parliamentary representation. AEC's consideration to deregister the party continued after the writs for the election were returned in June, and the party was deregistered at the federal level on 19 July 2022.

Policies and views 
The LDP states that it adheres to classical liberal, small government and laissez-faire principles coupled with what the party considers as a high regard for individual freedom and individual responsibility. LDP supported policies include:

National Policy 
 Opposes government imposed restrictions and mandates curtailing personal freedoms
 Support of citizen-initiated referendums, fixed parliamentary terms, recall elections and voluntary voting
 Federal budgets which are neither in surplus, nor deficit, but balanced
 Support of a 20% flat rate income tax with a $40,000 tax free threshold
 Supports voluntary superannuation
 Supports freezing and decentralising the minimum wage
 Supports utilisation of nuclear energy
 Supports decentralising education
 Supports free speech and opposes censorship
 Opposes mass surveillance and digital identities

Current and past policies and views 
 Ending the war on drugs - by legalisation of all drugs that are less harmful than both alcohol and tobacco (for example cannabis) and decriminalisation of all other drugs
 Supporting the implementation of pill testing
 Legalisation of assisted suicide
 Abolition of coercive psychiatry
 Ending political correctness and nanny state control (e.g. the now-lifted Sydney lockout laws)
 Support of competitive federalism and political decentralisation
 Support of extensive privatisation and deregulation: end government ownership of business enterprises including the ABC, SBS, Australia Post, government owned public schools, government owned public hospitals, electricity generation and public transport services
 Extensive reduction of taxes and fines, industrial relations regulations and government spending including welfare, health and the military, replacing most with a compulsory superannuation payment to fund social services and compulsory insurance cover for those whose balance does not meet a mandated minimum
 Support for commercial off-the-shelf and military off-the-shelf defense acquisitions where possible
 Deregulate industry to the greatest extent possible to build its international competitiveness
 Support of extensive free markets and free trade
 Support of the most efficient and effective electricity generation, with no options off the table
 Support of market over government responses to climate change
 Opposition to industry subsidies including corporate welfare
 Support the relaxation of foreign investment requirements and removal of restrictions against foreign ownership
 Call for reform to the anti-dumping legislation
 Opening up and removing the locking up of our state forests and national parks and proper management and conservation to prevent bushfires 
 Support for increasing barriers for immigrants to acquire Australian citizenship
 Maximisation of freedom of travel administered by a general immigration tariff on all non-humanitarian immigrants from other nations to replace the existing quota system
 Support of free migration agreements with more nations such as the current Australia/New Zealand agreement
 Unauthorised arrivals temporarily detained for health and security checks, transparent process for determining refugee status, community release under bail-like conditions while status is determined
 Removal of sin taxes (including for alcohol and tobacco)
 Equality before the law, including opposition to affirmative action
 Support of property owners' rights
 Support of motocross, cycling, fishing, bushwalking, hunting, logging, 4WD and shooting rights
 Opposition to government-mandated food labelling for religious purposes
 Decriminalise means to self-defence (including pepper spray, tasers and firearms under some circumstances)
 Restore to the States the power to impose income taxes and other taxes currently reserved to the Commonwealth
 Cease all Commonwealth involvement in health and education
 Marriage privatisation or getting the government out of the marriage business
 Some support for Pacific Solution of regional processing of asylum seekers in Nauru and Papua New Guinea
 Exemption for Sikh Australians from mandatory helmet laws
 Opposition to the introduction of laws for individual groups, such as Sharia law or Aboriginal law
 Opposition to government-funded foreign aid, other than short-term humanitarian relief, in favour of private charity

Election results

Federal parliament

State parliament

New South Wales

South Australia

Victoria

Western Australia

Political representatives

Current members of parliament
Victoria
 David Limbrick  – Victorian Legislative Council, 2018–present

Past members of parliament
Australia
 David Leyonhjelm – Australian Senate, 2014–2019
 Sam McMahon – Australian Senate, 2022–2022
 Duncan Spender – Australian Senate, 2019–2019
Victoria
 Tim Quilty – Victorian Legislative Council, 2018–2022
Western Australia
Aaron Stonehouse – Western Australia Legislative Council, 2017–2021

Donors 
The Australia Institute's 2019 report found that the Liberal Democratic Party had received political donations of $37,311 from pro-gun groups between July 2011 and March 2019. The report contextualises their donations as similar in value to the Nationals, Labor and Country Alliance, whilst being less than those to Katter's Australia Party, the Shooters Party, and the Liberal Party.

See also 
 List of political parties in Australia

References

External links 
 Official website

2001 establishments in Australia
Political parties established in 2001
Classical liberal parties
Liberal parties in Australia
Libertarian parties
Libertarianism in Australia
Non-interventionist parties
Political parties in Victoria (Australia)